David Anthony Gagnon (born October 31, 1967) is a Canadian retired professional ice hockey goaltender. Dave played 2 games in the National Hockey League with the Detroit Red Wings during the 1990–91 season, posting a record of 0–1–0 and goals against average of 10.27. The rest of his career, which lasted from 1990 to 2001, was spent in various minor leagues.

Playing career
Gagnon came up from the Windsor, Ontario Junior B team before joining Colgate University in 1987. Dave was guarding the net when the university was in the 1990 NCAA championship game. In 1990 and 1991 he was traded three times, but enjoyed success with Hampton Roads of ECHL, when he was named as co-MVP.  Gagnon spent most of his later years with the Roanoke Express where he often shared goaltending duties with Daniel Berthiaume.

The Red Wings signed him as a free agent in the summer of 1990. Gagnon played eleven more seasons in various minor leagues, being named playoff MVP twice in 1991 and 1994.

Career statistics

Regular season and playoffs

Awards and honors

OJHL-B First All-Star Team (1987)
ECAC Player of the Year (1990)
ECHL Playoff MVP (1991) (tied with Dave Flanagan)
ECHL Playoff MVP (1994)
ECHL Second All-Star Team (1995)

Transactions
Signed as a free agent by Detroit, June 11, 1990.

External links
 
 Dave Gagnon @ hockeygoalies.org

1967 births
Living people
AHCA Division I men's ice hockey All-Americans
Adirondack Red Wings players
Canadian ice hockey goaltenders
Colgate Raiders men's ice hockey players
Detroit Red Wings players
Fort Wayne Komets players
Hampton Roads Admirals players
Ice hockey people from Ontario
Minnesota Moose players
Roanoke Express players
Sportspeople from Windsor, Ontario
Toledo Storm players
Undrafted National Hockey League players